The Athenaeum or Melbourne Athenaeum is an art and cultural hub in the central business district of Melbourne, Victoria, Australia. Founded in 1839, it is the city's oldest cultural institution.

Its building on Collins Street in the East End Theatre District sits opposite the Regent Theatre, and currently consists of a main theatre, a smaller studio theatre, a restaurant and a subscription library. It has also served as a mechanics' institute, an art exhibition space, and a cinema. The building was added to the National Trust's Register of Historic Buildings in 1981 and is listed on the Victorian Heritage Register.

History

Early history
The first President was Captain William Lonsdale, the first Patron was the Superintendent of Port Phillip, Charles La Trobe and the first books were donated by Vice-President Henry Fyshe Gisborne. Originally called the Melbourne Mechanics' Institute, it was renamed in 1846 to the Melbourne Mechanics' Institution and School of Arts.

The building at 188 Collins Street was completed in 1842. The Melbourne City Council met in the building until 1852 when the Melbourne Town Hall was built.

The Institution changed its name to the Melbourne Athenaeum in 1872. At that time, as now, a focal point was the library. In 1877, membership was 1,681 and in 1879 there were 30,000 visits to the library. In 1880 it was reported 'that the floor of the large hall was the only one in Melbourne expressly constructed for dancing'. The front of the building was rebuilt in 1885 and 1886.

Among the office bearers of the institution in the nineteenth century was the author Marcus Clarke who was the chairman of the library committee in 1877.

Theatre and cinema
In October 1896, the first movie was shown in the Athenaeum Hall. This may not have been the first in Australia however, as a cinematograph was being demonstrated at the Melbourne Opera House in August.
On 26 January 1901 Life in Our Navy, a 60,000 foot film of life on HMS Jupiter, was shown by G. H. Snazelle, who provided additional entertainment. 
The Hall became a regular venue for screening films and the premiere of The Story of the Kelly Gang by the Tait brothers, the world's first dramatic feature film, was at the Athenaeum in 1906.

The theatre in its present form, a proscenium arch theatre with 880 seats on three levels, was created in 1924, designed by Henry Eli White. Renamed the Athenaeum Theatre, it was one of the first venues in Australia to screen talking pictures, presenting The Jazz Singer in February 1929. From the 1920s to the early 1970s, the theatre was mainly used as a cinema. The Melbourne Theatre Company (MTC) leased the theatre from 1976 to 1985 when the lease was taken over by various entrepreneurs who formed AT Management in 1997.

The upstairs studio theatre ("Ath 2"), created from the former art gallery by the MTC, has been used as a theatre space and the venue for The Last Laugh Comedy Club after it moved from North Melbourne.

Art gallery
The Athenaeum housed a small museum in its early days and then an art gallery. The gallery hosted the first exhibition of Frederick McCubbin's The Pioneer in 1904, and in 1918, the Australian tonalists staged their first group exhibition there. 'Jock' Frater held his first solo show there in 1923, marking his break from the Tonalists. The gallery also showed paintings by Rupert Bunny, Hans Heysen, Albert Namatjira, Tom Roberts, John Rowell, Ernest Buckmaster, Constance Stokes and Arthur Streeton, before closing in 1971. The gallery also hosted talks by the Melbourne Society of Women Painters, including one in 1935 at which Mary Cecil Allen spoke.

Subscription library
Membership of the Athenaeum's subscription library peaked at 7,579 in 1950, after the State Library of Victoria ceased lending of its books in 1939. Membership reduced over the subsequent decades to 1,600 by the mid-1980s, and 750 by the late 2000s. Membership is now increasing.

Today
Today, the Athenaeum Theatre is used for theatre, comedy and music performances, including as a principal venue for the Melbourne International Comedy Festival and Melbourne Opera. The Wheeler Centre for Books, Writing and Ideas presents discussions and talks at the theatre.

The subscription library has a 30,000-strong collection and hosts regular events, talks, book clubs and a screen club.

See also
List of theatres in the Melbourne City Centre
List of heritage listed buildings in Melbourne

References 

 Time-Line History of the Melbourne Athenaeum
The Melbourne Athenaeum, a short history, 2001.

External links
 Athenaeum Theatre website
 Melbourne Athenaeum website
 Melbourne Athenaeum archives website
 

Libraries in Melbourne
Theatres in Melbourne
Heritage-listed buildings in Melbourne
Organisations based in Melbourne
Victorian architecture in Victoria (Australia)
Subscription libraries in Australia
Collins Street, Melbourne
Buildings and structures in Melbourne City Centre
Landmarks in Melbourne